Richard C. Mulligan, Ph.D., (born 1954) is the Mallinckrodt Professor of Genetics at Harvard Medical School, and Director of the Harvard Gene Therapy Initiative.

He is a Director of Enzon Pharmaceuticals, Inc., and Biogen Idec, Inc.

Awards
 1981 MacArthur Fellows Program
 1983 Searle Scholar Program

Works
  Lindemann, D., Patriquin, E., Feng, S. and Mulligan, R.C. 1997 "Versatile retovirus vector systems for regulated gene expression in vitro and in vivo". Molecular Medicine 3:466-476.
 Goodell, M.A., Rosenzweig, H-.K., Marks, D.G., DeMaria, M., Paradis, G., Grupp, S.A., Sieff, C.A., Mulligan, R.C. and Johnson, R.P. 1997. "Dye efflux studies suggest the existence of CD34-negative/low hematopoietic stem cells in multiple species". Nature Medicine 3:1337–1345.
 Mach, N., Lantz, C.S., Galli, S.J., Reznikoff, G., Mihm, M., Small, C., Granstein, R., Beissert, S., Sadelain, M., Mulligan, R.C. and Dranoff, G. 1998. "Involvement of interleukin-3 in delayed-type hypersensitivity". Blood 92:778-783.

References

External links
"Richard C. Mulligan", Google Scholar

1954 births
MacArthur Fellows
Harvard Medical School faculty
Living people